Graecoanatolica is a genus of small freshwater snails, aquatic gastropod mollusks in the family Hydrobiidae.

Species
Species within the genus Graecoanatolica are as follows: 

Graecoanatolica anatolica Schütt, 1965
Graecoanatolica brevis Radoman, 1973
Graecoanatolica conica Radoman, 1973
†Graecoanatolica denizliensis (Taner, 1974)
Graecoanatolica dinarica Kebpaçi, Koca & Yilidrim, 2012
Graecoanatolica kocapinarica Radoman, 1973
Graecoanatolica lacustristurca Radoman, 1973
†Graecoanatolica macedonica Radoman & Stanovic, 1978
Graecoanatolica nageli Glöer & Pešić, 2015
Graecoanatolica pamphylica Schutt, 1964
Graecoanatolica tenuis Radoman, 1973
Graecoanatolica vegorriticola (Schütt, 1962)
Graecoanatolica yildirimi Glöer & Pešić, 2015

References

 
Hydrobiidae
Extinct gastropods
Extinct animals of Europe